Nebraska Highway 65 is a highway in southeastern Nebraska. The southern terminus of Nebraska Highway 65 is at the Kansas border south of Pawnee City. The northern terminus is in Table Rock at an intersection with Nebraska Highway 4.

Route description
Nebraska Highway 65 begins at the Kansas border. The road continues into Kansas as Bailey-Pawnee Road. Highway 65 goes north from the border on a gravel road. The highway becomes paved as it approaches Pawnee City. It then meets Nebraska Highway 8 at the western city limits of Pawnee City and they run concurrently going east until an intersection with Nebraska Highway 50. They then separate and Highway 65 goes east, then northeast and ends in Table Rock at an intersection with Nebraska Highway 4.

Major intersections

References

External links

 Nebraska Roads: NE 61-80

065
Transportation in Pawnee County, Nebraska